Georgios Georgiadis (born 8 March 1972) is a Greek former professional footballer, now a football coach. He made 61 appearances for the Greece national football team, and played for several Greek clubs including Panathinaikos FC and two spells at PAOK Thessaloniki FC. He was also signed by the English club Newcastle for a season. After retiring in 2008 he coached the Greece U21 side.

Playing career
Born in Kavala, Greece, Georgiadis' family, soon after his birth, left for Stuttgart, Germany, where young Giorgos first learned to play football. He returned to Greece, as a teenager and signed up for amateur side Keravnos Krinides. Soon he was discovered by Alpha Ethniki club Doxa Drama who signed him at age 17.

He transferred to major club Panathinaikos and played for the Athens greens from the 1993–94 until the 1997–98 season. He was member of the squad who reached the Champions League semi finals in 1995–96. His exposure to European football brought an offer from English Premiership side, Newcastle United, for £420,000 and Georgiadis joined fellow Greek Nikos Dabizas at St James' Park in the 1999 season. During that year, Newcastle United made it to the FA Cup Final but lost out to Manchester United. It was in the FA Cup that Georgiadis scored his only Newcastle goal, in the 4–1 win over Everton.

Georgiadis returned to Greece to play for PAOK FC from 2000 until 2003 before transferring to Olympiacos. Georgiadis was also a member of the Greece squad that won the UEFA Euro 2004.

He was released by Olympiacos after the 2004–05 season and was signed up by Iraklis Thessaloniki. After one and a half season with Iraklis, Georgiadis left the club as a free transfer to PAOK FC in January 2007. On 1 July 2008, he retired from professional football as a player.

He was capped 61 times and has scored 11 goals for the Greece national team. He won three Greek First Division with Panathinaikos and Olympiacos and six Greek Cups with Panathinaikos, Olympiacos and PAOK.

Managerial career

On 5 May it was announced that Georgiadis was appointed as a scout at his former club. Georgios Georgiadis after was called up to coach the Greece U21, after the previous coach Nikos Nioplias was named to coach Panathinaikos FC. In May 2013, Georgiadis was appointed caretaker manager for PAOK in place of Giorgos Donis successfully steering them to a 1st-place finish in the Super League playoffs. In March 2014, was appointed, for once more, caretaker manager for PAOK in place of Huub Stevens. In March 2015, was appointed, for once more, caretaker manager for PAOK in place of Angelos Anastasiadis.

On 18 June 2015, he was appointed as Veria F.C. manager.

On 5 September 2016, he was appointed Trikala F.C. manager.

On 13 January 2018, returned to PAOK appointed as a scout working for Ľuboš Micheľ in finding Greek young talents.

Career statistics

Managerial statistics

Honours
Panathinaikos
Super League Greece: 1994–95, 1995–96
Greek Cup: 1992–93, 1993–94, 1994–95; runner-up: 1996–97, 1997–98
Greek Super Cup: 1993, 1994

Newcastle United
FA Cup runner-up: 1998–99

PAOK
Greek Cup: 2000–01, 2002–03

Olympiacos
Super League Greece: 2004–05
Greek Cup: 2004–05; runner-up: 2003–04

Greece
UEFA European Championship: 2004

Individual
Greek Footballer of the Year: 1995

References

External links
 

1972 births
Living people
Association football midfielders
Premier League players
Doxa Drama F.C. players
Newcastle United F.C. players
Olympiacos F.C. players
Panathinaikos F.C. players
PAOK FC players
Iraklis Thessaloniki F.C. players
Veria F.C. managers
UEFA Euro 2004 players
UEFA European Championship-winning players
Greece international footballers
Greek footballers
Super League Greece players
Expatriate footballers in England
Greek expatriate footballers
Footballers from Kavala
PAOK FC non-playing staff
Trikala F.C. managers
Greek football managers